"I'm Gonna Hurt Her on the Radio" is a song written by Mac McAnally and Tom Brasfield. It was originally recorded by David Allan Coe on his 1985 album Unchained. Coe's version went to number 52 on the Hot Country Singles & Tracks chart that year.

It was later recorded by American country music artist Charley Pride, whose version changed the title to "I'm Gonna Love Her on the Radio". Pride's version was released in May 1988 as the second single and title track from the album I'm Gonna Love Her on the Radio.  The song reached number 13 on the same chart.

The song was also recorded under its original title by The Bellamy Brothers on their 1986 album Howard & David, Shenandoah on their 1988 self-titled debut, and Keith Whitley on the 1994 posthumous release Keith Whitley: A Tribute Album.

Chart performance

David Allan Coe

Charley Pride

References

Songs about radio
1985 singles
1988 singles
David Allan Coe songs
The Bellamy Brothers songs
Charley Pride songs
Shenandoah (band) songs
Keith Whitley songs
Songs written by Tom Brasfield
Songs written by Mac McAnally
1985 songs
Columbia Nashville Records singles
16th Avenue Records singles
Song recordings produced by Billy Sherrill